Diomedes Lake is the trapezoidal lake 480 m long in southeast-northwest direction and 112 m wide near the west extremity of Robbery Beaches on Byers Peninsula, Livingston Island in the South Shetland Islands, Antarctica. It has a surface area of 4.55 ha, and is separated from the waters of Barclay Bay by a 16 to 40 m wide strip of land, and surmounted by Penca Hill on the south and Enrique Hill on the northwest. The lake and its vicinity lye in a restricted zone of scientific importance to Antarctic microbiology, part of the Antarctic Specially Protected Area Byers Peninsula. The area was visited by early 19th century sealers.

The feature is named after the mythical king Diomedes of Thrace.

Location
Detailed Spanish mapping in 1992, and Bulgarian mapping of the area in 2009 and 2017.

Maps
 Península Byers, Isla Livingston. Mapa topográfico a escala 1:25000. Madrid: Servicio Geográfico del Ejército, 1992
 L. Ivanov. Antarctica: Livingston Island and Greenwich, Robert, Snow and Smith Islands. Scale 1:120000 topographic map. Troyan: Manfred Wörner Foundation, 2010.  (First edition 2009. )
 L. Ivanov. Antarctica: Livingston Island and Smith Island. Scale 1:100000 topographic map. Manfred Wörner Foundation, 2017. 
 Antarctic Digital Database (ADD). Scale 1:250000 topographic map of Antarctica. Scientific Committee on Antarctic Research (SCAR). Since 1993, regularly upgraded and updated

See also
 Antarctic lakes
 Livingston Island

Notes

References
 Diomedes Lake. SCAR Composite Gazetteer of Antarctica
 Bulgarian Antarctic Gazetteer. Antarctic Place-names Commission. (details in Bulgarian, basic data in English)
 M.A. de Pablo, M. Ramos and A. Molina. Snow cover evolution, on 2009-2014, at the Limnopolar Lake CALM-S site on Byers Peninsula, Livingston Island, Antarctica. Catena  149 (2017). pp. 538-547 (Map on Figure 1 featuring Diomedes Lake) 
 Management Plan for Antarctic Specially Protected Area No. 126 Byers Peninsula. Measure 4 (2016), ATCM XXXIX Final Report. Santiago, 2016

External links
 Diomedes Lake. Adjusted Copernix satellite image

Bodies of water of Livingston Island
Lakes of the South Shetland Islands
Bulgaria and the Antarctic